Lionel Nimrod's Inexplicable World was a BBC Radio 4 comedy series starring Stewart Lee and Richard Herring (the comedy duo Lee and Herring), and narrated by Tom Baker as the title character Lionel Nimrod, an over-the-top parody of Leonard Nimoy.  The show itself somewhat parodies the Leonard Nimoy programme  "In Search Of...". Over two series Lee and Herring tackled, and explained, such varying topics as Monsters, Love, The Human Body, and, finally, The Unexplained itself. Much of the comic material in the show was re-used on Fist of Fun.

The opening music, over which "Lionel Nimrod" introduces each show, is Jerry Goldsmith's theme to the film Logan's Run.

The series included performances by Armando Iannucci and Rebecca Front, who would both continue to work with Lee and Herring on many of their following productions. The series was produced by Sarah Smith. The show is regularly rebroadcast on BBC Radio 4 Extra.

Episodes

Series 1

Series 2

External links
Radiohaha online encyclopedia of British radio
Entry on FISTOFFUN.NET where MP3s of the shows can be downloaded

BBC Radio comedy programmes
1992 radio programme debuts